Kelvin John Locke (born 4 October 1980) is an English cricketer.  Locke is a right-handed batsman who plays as a wicket-keeper, can also bowl slow left-arm orthodox.  He was born in Northampton, Northamptonshire and educated at Bedford Modern School.

Locke made his debut for Buckinghamshire in the 1998 Minor Counties Championship against Suffolk.  Locke played Minor counties cricket for Buckinghamshire from 1998 to 2003, which included 29 Minor Counties Championship matches and 13 MCCA Knockout Trophy matches.  In 1999, he made his List A debut against the Yorkshire Cricket Board in the NatWest Trophy.  He played four further List A matches for Buckinghamshire, the last coming against Gloucestershire in the 2003 Cheltenham & Gloucester Trophy.  In his six List A matches, he scored 54 runs at a batting average of 13.50, with a high score of 41.  Behind the stumps he took 6 catches and made 3 stumpings.

He also played Second XI cricket for the Northamptonshire Second XI in 2000.

References

External links
Kelvin Locke at ESPNcricinfo
Kelvin Locke at CricketArchive

1980 births
People educated at Bedford Modern School
Living people
Cricketers from Northampton
English cricketers
Buckinghamshire cricketers
Wicket-keepers